The International Communist Seminar (ICS) was an annual communist conference held in May in Brussels, Belgium. It was organized by the Workers' Party of Belgium (WPB).

In 1992, Ludo Martens, leader of the WPB initiated the conference, which gathered various tendencies of Marxist-Leninist parties and organizations. He is noted for having proposed the unification of the four main tendencies of the Marxist-Leninist movement. These are the pro-Soviet groups, the pro-Chinese, the pro-Albanian, and pro-Cuban.  Around 200 organizations of Africa, Latin America, North America, Asia and Europe have taken part in it. For four years, from 1992 to 1995, the ICS worked on identifying "the true causes of the capitalist restoration in Soviet Union" and in Eastern Europe and to draw lessons from it for the future.

The last seminar took place in June 2014. The member parties have largely been absorbed into International Meeting of Communist and Workers' Parties.

Annual conference 
Themes of the recent ICS Conferences:
2014: 100 years after World War I – The world in 2014
2013: The attacks on the democratic rights and freedoms in the world capitalist crisis
2011: The strengthening of communist parties in times of a deepening capitalist systemic crisis
2006: Present and past experiences in the international communist movement: "The impact of the Communist International on the founding and the development of the communist parties in particular countries", "The exchange of concrete experiences of Party work in the working class and among the youth"
2005: Internationalist experiences and tasks of Communists in the struggle against imperialism
2004: The strategy and tactics of the struggle against global US imperialist war
2003: The Marxist-Leninist Party and the anti-imperialist Front facing the war
2002: Economical crises and the possibility of a major world crisis
2001: The world socialist revolution in the conditions of imperialist globalization.
2000: Imperialism, fascization and fascism
1999: Imperialism means war
1998: The working class, its leading role, new forms of exploitation and experiences of struggle and organization.
1997: The way of the October revolution is the way of the liberation of the workers
1996: The anti-imperialist struggle under the New World Order.

Participating parties

Afghanistan, People's Party of Afghanistan
Algeria, Algerian Party for Democracy and Socialism
Azerbaijan, Azerbaijan Communist Party
Belarus, Belarusian Communist Workers' Party
Belgium, Workers' Party of Belgium
Benin, Communist Party of Benin
Brazil, Communist Party of Brazil
Brazil, Free Homeland Party
Bulgaria, Party of Bulgarian Communists
China, Communist Party of China
Colombia, Colombian Communist Party
Cuba, Communist Party of Cuba
Cyprus, Progressive Party of Working People
Denmark, Communist Party of Denmark
Denmark, Communist Party in Denmark
France, Union of Revolutionary Communists of France
France, Pole of Communist Revival in France
Germany, German Communist Party
Greece, Communist Party of Greece
Hungary, Hungarian Workers' Party
Iran, Tudeh Party of Iran
Ireland, Workers' Party
Laos, Lao People's Revolutionary Party
Latvia, Socialist Party of Latvia
Lebanon, Lebanese Communist Party
Lithuania, Socialist People's Front
Luxembourg, Communist Party of Luxembourg
Malta, Communist Party of Malta
Mexico, Popular Socialist Party of Mexico
Netherlands, New Communist Party of the Netherlands
North Korea, Workers' Party of Korea
Palestine, Popular Front for the Liberation of Palestine
Palestine, Palestinian Communist Party
Philippines, Partido Komunista ng Pilipinas-1930
Portugal, Portuguese Communist Party
Russia, Communist Party of the Russian Federation
Russia, Russian Communist Workers' Party of the Communist Party of the Soviet Union
Russia, Communist Party of the Soviet Union (2001)
Serbia, New Communist Party of Yugoslavia
South Sudan, Communist Party of South Sudan
Spain, Communist Party of Spain
Spain, Spanish Communist Workers' Party
Spain, Communist Party of the Peoples of Spain
Sri Lanka, People's Liberation Front
Sweden, Communist Party
Switzerland, Swiss Party of Labour
Switzerland, Communist Party of Southern Switzerland
Switzerland, Communist Party of Geneva - "Les Communistes"
Taiwan, Labor Party
Tunisia, Democratic Patriots' Party
Turkey, Communist Party of Turkey
Turkey, Labour Party
Ukraine, Union of Communists of Ukraine
United Kingdom, Communist Party of Great Britain (Marxist–Leninist)
USA, Freedom Road Socialist Organization
Venezuela, Communist Party of Venezuela
Vietnam, Communist Party of Vietnam

See also
International Meeting of Communist and Workers' Parties
List of left-wing internationals

References

External links
1999 Declaration of the International Communist Seminar

Left-wing internationals
Political conferences
Communist organizations